Ant was a Turkish political magazine with a socialist leaning that existed between 1967 and 1971. The magazine is one of the socialist publications which appeared in the 1960s when socialist movements were on rise in Turkey like in other countries.

History and profile
Ant was established by Turkish writers, Fethi Naci, Yaşar Kemal and Doğan Özgüden in 1967. The first issue of the weekly appeared on the 3 January 1967. The journal had 173 issues as a weekly until April 1970. After it was published as a monthly with the name Ant - A journal of socialist theory and action and had 84, but much smaller pages. Although the magazine was viewed as supportive of the Workers' Party of Turkey (TIP), it was not an official organ of the party. In the first issue, a socialist stance against the capitalists and landowners was announced. In later issues articles on the theories of Engels, Lenin, Ho Chi Minh or the Palestinian Nayef Hawatmeh were treated. In its first year of the magazines existence, several of its writers like Çetin Altan or Can Yücel were brought to court over terrorism related charges. In the early 1970s, Ant drifted away from TİP. It blamed Mehmet Ali Aybar for the loss in the parliamentary election of 1969 and began advocating the build-up of a new revolutionary party and gradually it began arguing for the urban guerrilla line. The magazine basically targeted workers, villagers and students who took part in the mass social struggle in Turkey also supporting workers strikes. As a monthly its last issue was published in May 1971 when it was closed down in the aftermath of the coup d'état.  

After the coup Ant's editors, Doğan Özgüden and Inci Tugsavul, fled to Europe, and founded the Info-Türk group.

References

External links
 Archive of the magazine

1967 establishments in Turkey
1971 disestablishments in Turkey
Defunct political magazines published in Turkey
Magazines established in 1967
Magazines disestablished in 1971
Monthly magazines published in Turkey
Socialist magazines
Turkish-language magazines
Weekly magazines published in Turkey